The New Britain goshawk (Accipiter princeps) is a bird of prey species in the family Accipitridae. It is endemic to Papua New Guinea.

Its natural habitats are subtropical or tropical moist lowland forest and subtropical or tropical moist montane forest. It is threatened by habitat loss.

Formerly classified as Near Threatened by the IUCN, it was suspected to be rarer than previously assumed. Following the evaluation of its population status, this was found to be correct, and it is consequently uplisted to vulnerable status in 2008.

References

New Britain goshawk
Birds of New Britain
New Britain goshawk
Taxonomy articles created by Polbot